Parade of the Wooden Soldiers is a 1933 Fleischer Studios live-action and animated short film starring Betty Boop.

The instrumental title theme, "Parade of the Wooden Soldiers" (also known as "Parade of the Tin Soldiers"), was composed by Leon Jessel.

Plot
A large factory complex struggles to produce a single package, which is rushed to a toy store. The box opens, and out steps a Betty Boop doll. The other toys come to life, parade around to the music of Parade of the Wooden Soldiers and crown her their queen. But a large stuffed toy of King Kong begins breaking things up by kidnapping Betty. Eventually, the big ape is defeated, and the (somewhat damaged) toys resume their parade, and afterwards fall still on a counter in a store selling damaged toys.

References

External links
 Parade Of The Wooden Soldiers on Youtube
 
 Parade of the Wooden Soldiers at the Big Cartoon Database
 Downloadable cartoon at archive.org (public domain, MPEG4, 9.5MB)

1933 films
1933 short films
Films about sentient toys
Betty Boop cartoons
1930s American animated films
1930s animated short films
American black-and-white films
1933 animated films
Paramount Pictures short films
Fleischer Studios short films